Voivodeship Road 111 (abbreviated DW 111) is a route in the Polish voivodeship roads network. The route links Recław near Wolin with the western bypass of Goleniów with the Expressway S3 and National Road 6. The route was separated from the Voivodeship Road 113 on 1 January 2013.

Important settlements along the route

Święta
Modrzewie
Goleniów

Route plan

References

111